William Tepper (June 27, 1948 – October 4, 2017) was an American actor and screenwriter, best known for his lead role in Jack Nicholson's directorial debut, Drive, He Said (1971).

Biography
Tepper was born on June 27, 1948 in The Bronx borough of New York City. He studied filmmaking at the University of California, Los Angeles.

Tepper starred opposite Karen Black in Drive, He Said, which also marked Jack Nicholson's debut as a film director. Tepper and Nicholson traveled to the 1971 Cannes Film Festival for the film's debut. Tepper's other film roles included Breathless in 1983 and a co-starring role in the 1984 Tom Hanks film, Bachelor Party, as well as the 1970s television series, Ironside and Kojak.

In addition to acting, Tepper co-produced the 1980 dramatic film, Heart Beat, which starred Nick Nolte and Sissy Spacek. Tepper also produced and wrote the screenplay for the 2006 film, Grilled, starring Ray Romano, Kevin James and Sofia Vergara.

Tepper died of a heart attack on October 4, 2017, at the age of 69.

Filmography

References

External links

1948 births
2017 deaths
American male film actors
American male television actors
American male screenwriters
American film producers
UCLA Film School alumni
People from the Bronx